Guy Héraud (29 October 1920, in Avignon – 28 December 2003) was a French politician and lawyer. He was the candidate of the European Federalist Party in the 1974 French presidential election, where he won only 0.08% of the vote (exactly: 0.07539557%) and last place. His result remains the lowest score ever obtained by a candidate in any French presidential election.

Guy Héraud was also the author of books on federalism. He was an expert on minority issues and problems of European federalism

1920 births
2003 deaths
Politicians from Avignon
Politicians of the French Fifth Republic
Stateless nationalism in Europe
Candidates in the 1974 French presidential election